The Very Best Definitive Ultimate Greatest Hits Collection is a two-disc compilation album by American band Faith No More. It was released on June 1, 2009 in the UK to coincide with the band's reunion tour. This double disc set contains the band's greatest hits on the first CD, while the second CD features B-sides and rarities.

Track listing

Charts

References

Faith No More albums
Alternative metal compilation albums
2009 greatest hits albums
Rhino Records compilation albums